Vincoline is an alkaloid isolated from Catharanthus roseus.  In a mouse model, it has been found to stimulate insulin secretion.

References

Tryptamine alkaloids
Indolizidines